Scott Wiener (born May 11, 1970) is an American politician and a member of the California State Senate. A Democrat, he represents the 11th Senate District, encompassing San Francisco and parts of San Mateo County.

Prior to his election to the State Senate in 2016, Wiener served on the San Francisco Board of Supervisors representing District 8. He also served as Chair of the San Francisco County Transportation Authority, represented San Francisco as a commissioner on the regional Metropolitan Transportation Commission, and represented San Francisco as a director on the Golden Gate Bridge, Highway and Transportation District Board.

During his political career, Wiener has been known as a prominent advocate for various measures to facilitate more housing construction in California to alleviate the California housing shortage.

Early life and career
Wiener was born to a Jewish family in Philadelphia, Pennsylvania, and grew up in southern New Jersey, the son of small business owners. He graduated from Washington Township High School, received his bachelor's degree from Duke University, studied in Santiago, Chile on a Fulbright Scholarship, and received his J.D. degree from Harvard Law School. He clerked for Justice Alan B. Handler on the Supreme Court of New Jersey.

In 1997, Wiener moved to San Francisco to work as a litigation attorney at Heller Ehrman White & McAuliffe. In 2002, he went to work as a deputy city attorney, under San Francisco City Attorney Dennis Herrera.

Before running for Board of Supervisors, Wiener served as chair of the San Francisco Democratic County Central Committee.

In 2016, Wiener ran for the 11th Senate District, to succeed termed out Senator Mark Leno. As it is required to include a Chinese name on the ballot (17% of the San Francisco population speak Chinese), Wiener, who is very tall, chose the name Wei Shangao, meaning "bold, majestic, charitable, and tall".

Wiener received several endorsements, including one by Senator Leno. He ultimately defeated fellow Supervisor Jane Kim in the November general election, to win election to the State Senate.

Wiener won re-election to his state senate seat in 2020.

San Francisco Supervisor
Wiener was elected to the San Francisco Board of Supervisors on November 2, 2010, carrying 42.4% of the vote in the first round of ranked choice voting. After the two lowest candidates were dropped, Wiener won election with 18,239 votes, or 55.4%, over the second-place finisher, attorney Rafael Mandelman.

Wiener was re-elected on November 4, 2014, on the first round of ranked choice voting, carrying a majority of the vote.

Housing
In 2011, after a string of fires caused by arson in San Francisco's Castro district, Wiener authored legislation allowing residents temporarily displaced by fires or natural disasters to rent other apartments at below-market rates. Previously, landlords willing to rent out apartments to a tenant on a temporary basis could not offer lower rents without locking these rates in at that rate under rent control.

In 2012, Wiener passed legislation promoting the production of student housing while restricting the conversion of existing rental stock to student housing. That same year, the Board passed legislation to allow the construction of residential units as small as 220 square feet, known as micro-apartments.

In 2014, Wiener introduced two measures to allow the construction of new in-law units in San Francisco: The first allows units to be built within the Castro neighborhood, and the second allows owners of buildings undergoing seismic retrofit to add in-law units. In 2016, Wiener authored legislation to fast-track the approval of affordable housing projects.

In 2016, Wiener introduced legislation to extend rent control protections to people living with HIV/AIDS.

Transportation
Wiener focused much of his policy work on San Francisco's public transportation. He criticized the lack of investment in transit in San Francisco, and advocated for additional funding measures. His proposals included changing the transit-impact development fee and a ballot measure to tie Muni funding to population growth. The latter measure, Measure B, required 75% of increased funding to improve Muni reliability and 25% of the funding to improve street safety. Measure B was passed on November 4, 2014.

Wiener also encouraged increases in the number of taxis in San Francisco and supported expanding access to car-share programs.

In 2013, the full Board of Supervisors passed Wiener's legislative package to streamline pedestrian safety projects. The legislation included creating a centralized Street Design Review Committee, making it easier for developers to implement pedestrian safety projects as gifts to the city, and amending the Fire Code to provide more leeway for sidewalk extensions.

Over his tenure as a Supervisor, Wiener advocated for increased pedestrian safety by advocating against widening streets. In 2014, this led to a public disagreement with the San Francisco Fire Department around street design at new developments at Hunters Point and Candlestick Point. The Fire Department sought to widen streets in these developments to be 26 feet wide, 6 feet wider than the legal requirement.

Public spaces
In 2012, Wiener sponsored controversial legislation banning nudity at un-permitted events, which was eventually passed by the Board. Wiener stated that "[t]his is what local government is for—to respond to the issues affecting citizens where they live."

In 2013, the Board of Supervisors passed another bill authored by Wiener establishing park hours for San Francisco's parks. The supervisor claimed the ban was needed to combat vandalism and illegal dumping. Critics said it was unfairly aimed at the homeless.

Wiener was active in promoting and regulating food trucks. In 2013, Wiener's legislation establishing guidelines for San Francisco's food truck industry was passed by the Board of Supervisors.

Another of Wiener's policy focuses was increasing government spending on parks, including supporting the expansion of park patrol in budget negotiations. Wiener also authored legislation to have the city government purchase a parking lot on 24th Street and turn it into a public park.

On the Budget Committee, Wiener advocated for adding government funding for maintenance and safety in San Francisco's parks and other public spaces. He was also involved in efforts to increase municipal spending on street resurfacing and maintenance of street trees and park trees.

Environment
In 2015, Wiener authored legislation to make San Francisco the first city in the country to require water recycling in new developments. He also proposed legislation to require each unit in multi-unit buildings have their own water submeters.

Nightlife and culture
Early in his first term, Wiener requested a study of the economic impacts of entertainment and nightlife, an issue in his first campaign. The study, completed by the San Francisco City Economist, found San Francisco nightlife generated $4.2 billion in economic productivity in 2010.

In 2013, Wiener authored legislation to make it easier for businesses to get permits for DJs, and to offer a new permit to allow for live music in plazas.

HIV and LGBT issues 
In September 2014, in an online essay on the Huffington Post, Wiener revealed that he was taking Truvada, a pre-exposure prophylaxis (PrEP) that reduces the risk of HIV infection. Wiener stated that he disclosed his usage of PrEP in an effort to reduce the stigma around taking the HIV prevention medication. Wiener also cited the need for more awareness and expanding access as other keys for making PrEP successful. He also worked with David Campos to support ensuring low-cost access to Truvada for pre-exposure prophylaxis against HIV after Wiener revealed his own PrEP use.

As a member of the Board's budget committee, Wiener advocated for HIV/AIDS services and restoring lost federal funds. In 2016, he helped secure funding for San Francisco's Getting to Zero effort, which aims to end all new HIV infections in San Francisco.

In 2016, he introduced a bill, passed by the Board, barring the city from doing business with companies based in states that have laws that bar policies banning discrimination against lesbian, gay, bisexual, and transgender people, such as North Carolina, Tennessee, and Mississippi.

Parental leave
In 2016, Wiener authored first-in-the-country legislation to require fully paid parental leave for new parents after childbirth or adoption, applying to both parents. As a result of this legislation, employers in San Francisco must give employees up to six weeks of paid time off.

Soda tax
In 2014, Wiener introduced a ballot measure that would have imposed a two cents per ounce tax on the distribution of sodas and other sweetened beverages, and used the money to fund "healthy choices" in San Francisco. The measure, which was also sponsored by Supervisors Malia Cohen, Eric Mar, John Avalos, David Chiu, and David Campos, aimed to reduce soda consumption and increase programs to combat the rise of diabetes and other related diseases in San Francisco. The proposal was endorsed by much of San Francisco's local political establishment, including all its state legislators, and many health organizations, but voters in the November 4, 2014 election did not give the measure the  supermajority required to impose a new tax. The American Beverage Association spent more than $9 million to defeat Measure E, which was also opposed by the Libertarian Party of San Francisco. Ultimately, the measure garnered 55.6% of the vote, below the 66% needed to pass.

State Senate 
Wiener serves as the Chair of the Senate Housing Committee in the California State Senate and is a member of the Energy, Utilities and Communications Committee, as well as Governance and Finance, Joint Legislative Audit, and Public Safety Committees. He is also the Assistant Majority Whip and serves as the Chair of the California Legislative LGBTQ Caucus.

Psychedelic decriminalization 
In 2021, Wiener authored, sponsored, and introduced SB-519, a bill that provides for the decriminalization of psilocybin, DMT (N,N-Dimethyltryptamine), LSD (lysergic acid diethylamide), ibogaine, ketamine, mescaline, and MDMA (3,4-methylenedioxymethamphetamine) in the state of California. The bill would eliminate criminal penalties for the consumption, possession, and social sharing of these substances and the plants or fungi that contain them. The bill also has a provision that legalizes the furnishing of these substances by licensed physicians/NPs/PAs and licensed mental health practitioners for therapeutic purposes in the treatment of patients. SB-519 passed in the California State Senate by a vote of 21–16 on June 1, 2021. It headed to the California Assembly for a vote to determine final approval, however, after a third reading it was ordered to the inactive file on August 25, 2022 by Assemblywoman Eloise Gòmez Reyes. It officially died on November 30, 2022 in the Assembly with no further action to be taken.

HIV and LGBT issues 
In 2017, Wiener originated three bills centered around HIV and LGBT issues. He co-authored Senate Bill 239, which lowered the penalty of exposing someone to HIV without their knowledge and consent from a felony to a misdemeanor. Wiener said that the laws had unfairly singled out HIV-positive people. The bill passed and was signed by Governor Jerry Brown on October 6, 2017.

Wiener co-authored Senate Bill 179 in 2017, to create a third, non-binary gender option on government documents, which passed in 2018.

Wiener authored Senate Bill 219 in 2017, which strengthened protections against "discrimination based on sexual orientation, gender identity, gender expression, or HIV status" for LGBT seniors living in long-term care facilities. The bill was opposed by groups who argued that the bill criminalized bathroom gender designations and would force care providers to address those under their care with gender-appropriate language. Wiener called these arguments "transphobic" and "absurd". The naming provision of the law was overturned on July 16, 2021, after the Third District Court of Appeals ruled that the law violated employees' free speech rights.

In October 2019, Governor Gavin Newsom signed Wiener's legislation expanding access to HIV-prevention medications PrEP and PEP. Under the new law, pharmacists can distribute HIV pre- and post-prophylaxes without a physician's prescription.

In 2019 and 2020, Wiener attempted to pass Senate Bill 201, a bill that would have restricted physician and parents' ability to decide to perform reconstructive genital surgery on intersex infants, and would instead require the impacted child be old enough to decide to undergo surgery. The bill was opposed by the California Medical Association and other medical groups who said they would not be able to apply medical expertise, which would threaten patient safety. The bill died in committee. Wiener re-introduced the bill a second time in January 2021, this time as Senate Bill 225.

Wiener introduced Senate Bill 145 on January 18, 2019. The bill proposed to remove the requirement to place someone convicted of non-forcible oral or anal sex with a minor over the age of 14 (provided the convicted is less than 10 years older) on the sex offender registry, instead leaving this to the judge’s discretion, as was the case for vaginal sex. He argued that existing law was discriminatory towards LGBT couples where the partners were just above and below the age of legal consent. Wiener received online harassment and death threats from those who claimed the bill protected pedophiles. The bill was signed into law by Gavin Newsom in September 2020.

Solar energy and storage 
In 2017, Wiener sponsored two bills that expanded solar and renewable energy use in California. Senate Bill 71 required solar to be installed on many new buildings in California; the bill's rooftop mandate was loosened by regulators in 2020 to allow offsite solar to be purchased instead. Senate Bill 700 created a 10-year program to give rebates to customers who install energy storage systems, including batteries.

Net neutrality 
In 2018, Wiener authored Senate Bill 822 which enacted net neutrality protections. Later signed by the governor, this bill reinstated Obama-era regulations in California and banned zero-rating. This legislation was the subject of litigation from the US Justice Department and several trade groups. In February 2021, the Justice Department dropped out of the lawsuit, and a federal judge dismissed the challenge by the trade groups.

Presidential tax return disclosure 

In 2019, Wiener co-authored Senate Bill 27, which would have required presidential candidates to disclose their tax returns to be eligible to appear on a California primary ballot. The bill was signed into law by Gavin Newsom and subsequently challenged in court by lawyers of Donald Trump. In September 2019, a federal judge blocked the law, stating it violated four separate sections of the Constitution of the United States in addition to a separate federal law. The Attorney General of California appealed the judge's decision, with a decision expected by a federal appeals court sometime after the March 2020 primary election.

In a November 2019 unanimous ruling, the California Supreme Court said the law violated the California Constitution and that Donald Trump may appear on the state's March 2020 primary ballot without being required to release his tax returns.

Bike lanes 

In 2019, Senator Wiener authored Senate Bill 127, which would increase the amount of revenue from the state's new gas tax that could be directed to bike lanes or pedestrian improvements from $100 million to $1 billion. The bill received a veto from Governor Newsom due to opposition from Caltrans over its cost and the potential loss of federal highway funds.

State estate tax 

In 2019, Wiener co-authored Senate Bill 378, which would have imposed a 40 percent estate tax in California for estates over $3.5 million, or $7 million for a married couple, until the federal estate tax threshold is reached. The bill failed to move out of committee.

Housing 
In 2017, Wiener authored SB 35 (which was approved as part of a 15-bill housing package that also included funding and other bills to reform housing production in California) which will require the cities that have fallen behind on their state housing production goals to streamline approval of new housing.

"Local control is about how a community achieves its housing goals, not whether it achieves those goals," Wiener said in a statement. "SB 35 sets clear and reasonable standards to ensure that all communities are part of the solution by creating housing for our growing population."

In 2018, in an effort to address the state's housing affordability crisis and  emissions, Wiener introduced Senate Bill 827, which would require cities and counties to allow apartment buildings of four to eight stories in "transit rich areas"—defined as land within a half-mile of a major transit stop or a quarter mile of a stop on a high-frequency bus route. Wiener introduced the bill as part of a housing package, along with bills to make it easier to build farmworker housing and to improve local accountability to build new housing.  SB 827 failed to make it out of committee. In 2019, Wiener introduced SB 50, a follow-up to Senate Bill 827. This version did not advance through committee in the senate in 2019 and was reconsidered in the 2020 legislative session, where it was killed in a senate floor vote, marking the third failed attempt by Wiener to pass a transit-density housing bill.

In 2020, in a fourth failed attempt at passing a statewide upzoning bill, Senator Wiener introduced legislation (Senate Bill 902) that would allow 2 to 4 unit apartment buildings on single-family lots throughout California, depending on a city's size.

Wiener was the co-author of a fifth failed upzoning bill in 2020, Senate Bill 1120, which would have required the approval of duplexes proposed on any single family lot in California.

In 2021, Wiener successfully authored and co-authored several housing bills. Wiener authored Senate Bill 10 and Senate Bill 478, and he co-authored Senate Bill 9 as well. SB 9 upzones most of California to allow for up to 4 housing units per lot, and SB 10 makes it easier for local governments to rezone for higher densities near transit rich areas. SB 478 prevents local governments from imposing a FAR or a minimum lot size that would make dense housing impossible.

In 2022, Wiener proposed legislation that would exempt the UC, CSU and community college systems from the lengthy California Environmental Quality Act review process. The CEQA process has been used to obstruct, delay, and block campus and housing developments in California. Earlier in 2022, UC Berkeley was forced to cut its enrollment figures because some Berkeley residents used CEQA to block and delay Berkeley from enrolling students.

Alcohol sales until 4 AM 
Nationwide, 2 AM is the most common last call time, though bars in New York City can serve until 4 AM and some until 5 AM in Chicago. Citing the cultural and economic benefits of nightlife, Wiener proposed legislation to allow cities to extend alcohol sales in bars and restaurants to 4 AM. Senator Mark Leno, Wiener's predecessor, had attempted to pass a similar bill. The bill passed the Senate with bipartisan support, but failed in the Assembly. Wiener reintroduced the bill the following year, this time limited to six cities whose mayors had supported the idea: San Francisco, Oakland, Los Angeles, Sacramento, West Hollywood, and Long Beach. The bill (SB 905) was expanded to include Palm Springs, Cathedral City and Coachella, and passed the Assembly 51-22 and the Senate 28–8. Governor Jerry Brown vetoed the legislation September 28, 2018 citing California Highway Patrol concerns over drunk drivers.

Wiener's most recent bill, SB 930, would allow seven cities to serve alcohol until 4 AM under a five-year pilot program, if their city councils allow it.  Proponents say that it would help venues still recovering from the pandemic stay in business, while opponents say that it would add to alcohol-related problems, including DUIs in cities adjacent to those allowing later last calls.

Environment 
In January 2021, Wiener introduced SB 252, the Bear Protection Act. Sponsored by the Humane Society of the United States, SB 252 would ban the sport hunting of black bears, except in situations where the bears must be killed for safety reasons, protecting property, livestock, endangered species, or scientific research. This legislation drew immediate support from animal rights activists. Critics of SB 252 claim that Bear Tags (the license needed to go bear hunting) generate $1.39 million in revenue that goes towards California's wildlife agency.

Incidents

Robbery 
In 2015, Wiener was robbed of his cell phone on the corner of 16th and Valencia in San Francisco. He negotiated with the would-be thieves and got them to agree to accept $200 for the return of his phone. The foursome walked to a nearby ATM, where the transaction was caught on tape by the cameras at the ATM. A Wells Fargo security guard also observed the robbery in progress, and called the police. A woman and a man were later arrested and charged with second-degree robbery.

Bomb threat 
In June 2022, Wiener was the victim of a false bomb threat, reportedly due to his work on behalf of LGBT community.

Personal life
Wiener is openly gay. He is Jewish.

References 

 Retrieved March 7, 2023

External links 
 
 Campaign website
 
 Join California Scott Wiener

1970 births
20th-century American Jews
20th-century American lawyers
20th-century American LGBT people
21st-century American Jews
21st-century American lawyers
21st-century American politicians
21st-century American LGBT people
American LGBT city council members
Democratic Party California state senators
Duke University alumni
Gay Jews
Gay politicians
Harvard Law School alumni
Jewish American state legislators in California
LGBT people from Pennsylvania
LGBT people from San Francisco
LGBT people from the San Francisco Bay Area
LGBT state legislators in California
Living people
People from Washington Township, Gloucester County, New Jersey
San Francisco Board of Supervisors members
Washington Township High School (New Jersey) alumni